The 2017–18 World Boxing Super Series – cruiserweight division was a World Boxing Super Series professional boxing tournament that took place between September 2017 and July 2018 in several countries. The Super Series featured eight top-rated cruiserweight boxers in a single-elimination tournament. Its winner will hold world titles for all four of boxing's major sanctioning bodies, The Ring Magazine title, as well as the Muhammad Ali trophy. The tournament was organized by Comosa AG. A super middleweight tournament was held concurrently, with prize money for both competitions totalling US$50 million.

At the start of the cruiserweight portion of the tournament, the world championship titles recognized by the four different sanctioning bodiesWBA (established 1921), WBC (est. 1963), IBF (est. 1983) and WBO (est. 1988)were held by four different boxers. All four of these boxers participated in the tournament, resulting in the eventual tournament champion, Oleksandr Usyk, becoming only the fourth boxer in history to become the undisputed champion of a weight class by holding the world titles from all four these sanctioning bodies.

Participants 

Krzysztof Głowacki and Mateusz Masternak are tournament reserves.

Bracket 
The format of the tournament required four seeded fighters to each choose their opponent from the four remaining unseeded fighters in a draft. The seeded fighters were determined by the organizers. The draft took place on July 8, 2017, in a gala hosted by actress Melanie Winiger in Monte Carlo. Per IBF rules, Gassiev had to defend his title against Włodarczyk before facing anyone else. Therefore, that matchup was pre-arranged before the draft.

Quarterfinals

Usyk vs. Huck 

In the inaugural match of the Super Series, top-seeded Oleksandr Usyk sought to defend his title against Marco Huck. At the weigh-in, Usyk hitting the scales at precisely 199 lbs, while Huck weighed-in at 198 lbs. The fight took place at Max-Schmeling-Halle and was announced by Jimmy Lennon Jr. At the final press conference, a bit of controversy occurred during the head to head photo, where Huck pushed his opponent Usyk.

The first Super Series quarter-final saw Usyk successfully retain his WBO title and advance to the semi-finals after the referee stepped in to stop the encounter and save Huck from further punishment. The official time of the stoppage was 2:16 in round 10. Usyk had little trouble in the fight. Huck provided heart and toughness, showing he was certainly not a pushover but Usyk's boxing skills were too much, completely outboxing Huck and continuously landing punches. The win was Usyk's third successful title defense, and sees him advance to the next stage of the Super Series.

The undercard was headlined by a bout between Noel Gevor and Isiah Thomas. Both fighters were coming off losses, but Gevor got the win via unanimous decision, with all three judges scoring the fight 100–89 in favor of Gevor.

Dorticos vs. Kudryashov 

The second Super Series cruiserweight quarterfinal featured Yuniel Dorticos defending his WBA (Regular) title against Dmitry Kudryashov. The bout generated some expectation, as Kudryashov and Dorticos were both known as knockout punchers, with 42 out of 43 of their combined previous fights ending by way of knockout. This will be the Super Series' first match in the United States. A percentage of the gate revenue will be donated to the San Antonio Food Bank to aid victims of Hurricane Harvey. At the official weigh-in, Dmitry Kudryashov initially missed weight by half a pound, coming in at 200 1⁄2 lbs. However, he was able to come in at exactly 200 lbs in a second try 45 minutes later. Dorticos weighed in at 199 lbs.

On fight night, Dorticos retained his title and advanced to the semi-finals by knocking out Kudryashov in just 2 rounds. The fight started with a slow-paced, feel out round, with both boxers studying their opponent. Dorticos successfully executed a pull counter as the bell sounded. In round 2, the pace of the fight increased, with Dorticos and Kudryashov trading combinations. Eventually, Dorticos gained the upper hand by landing a series of one-two combos, as Kudryashov retreated behind his high guard. Dorticos ended the contest by knocking out Kudryashov with a right hook. The referee waived the count with a minute left in round 2.

In the undercard, Keith Tapia won a wide unanimous decision over Lateef Kayode (100–89, 100–89, 99–90), having dropped him once at the end of round 6. Earlier, four-weight world champion Nonito Donaire defeated Rubén García Hernández by unanimous decision (100–90, 99–91, 97–93) for the WBC Silver featherweight title.

Briedis vs. Perez 

Mairis Briedis defended his WBC cruiserweight title against Mike Perez in the third WBSS cruiserweight quarterfinal. This was Perez's second fight as a cruiserweight, after he came down from the heavyweight division following a TKO loss to Alexander Povetkin. The bout took place in Briedis' hometown of Riga, at the eponymous Arena Riga. At the official weigh-in, Briedis tipped the scales at 198 1⁄2 lbs, while Mike Perez came in lighter, at 197 1⁄3 lbs.

Briedis won a scrappy fight in his hometown, beating Mike Perez by unanimous decision after 12 rounds (116–110, 114–112, 115–111). Perez was deducted a point in round 3 following an accidental headbutt. Briedis was also docked a point during round 10 for excessive holding. With the win, Briedis moves on to the semifinals to face top-seeded Oleksandr Usyk.

The undercard saw tournament reserve Krzysztof Głowacki beat Leonardo Bruzesse via 5th-round knockout and super heavyweight Olympic medalist Filip Hrgović dominate and defeat Zumbano Love via TKO in the first round in his professional debut.

Gassiev vs. Włodarczyk 

The final cruiserweight quarterfinal match was between IBF champion Murat Gassiev and former IBF and WBC champion Krzysztof Włodarczyk. the fight would take place in Newark, New Jersey at the Prudential Center on 21 October 2017. One of the main factors for the fight taking place in New Jersey was due to the Polish population in that state. At the official weigh-in, Gassiev tipped the scales at 199 lb, while Włodarczyk weighed 199 1⁄2 lb.

Gassiev delivered a dominant 3rd-round KO, retaining his IBF title and securing his place in the semi finals. Gassiev was in control the opening two rounds working away on Włodarczyk. Midway through round 3, having Włodarczyk against the ropes, Gassiev connected with a left uppercut to the head, which was immediately followed by a left to the body, dropping Włodarczyk on all fours, flat on the canvas. Włodarczyk, clearly in pain, failed to beat the 10 count. The official time of stoppage was 1:57 of the round. Gassiev, who was pleased with his performance, said, "I had a great opponent tonight. I prepared myself for a tough fight, but it is boxing, and anything can happen. We do a lot of work in the gym, and I just listened to my coach round after round, and he told me what I needed to do. That's all I needed." Włodarczyk accepted defeat admitting the better man won.

On the undercard, Maciej Sulęcki defeated Jack Culcay via unanimous decision, and tournament alternate Mateusz Masternak beat Stivens Bujaj.

Semifinals
All four pre-tournament champions emerged from the quarterfinals, retaining their respective cruiserweight world champion titles: Usyk as champion of the WBO; Briedis as champion of the WBC; Gassiev as champion of the IBF; and Dorticos as champion of the WBA. This meant that each semifinal bout would result in a champion unifying two sanctioning bodies' titles.

On 27 January 2018, Usyk defeated Briedis by a majority decision, becoming the unified WBC–WBO champion. On 3 February 2018, Gassiev defeated Dorticos by a technical knockout in the 12th round, becoming the unified WBA–IBF champion.

Final
Initially, the final was scheduled for 11 May 2018 in Jeddah, Saudi Arabia, but later it was rescheduled for 21 July 2018 in Moscow, Russia.

Usyk defeated Gassiev by a unanimous decision, unifying the cruiserweight titles of all four major sanctioning organizations, becoming the undisputed cruiserweight world champion.

See also 
 2017–18 World Boxing Super Series – super middleweight division

References 

World Boxing Super Series
World Boxing Super Series
World Boxing Super Series